Paulo Moratore (born 9 May 1968) is a Brazilian handball player. He competed at the 1992 Summer Olympics and the 1996 Summer Olympics.

References

1968 births
Living people
Brazilian male handball players
Olympic handball players of Brazil
Handball players at the 1992 Summer Olympics
Handball players at the 1996 Summer Olympics
Handball players from São Paulo
20th-century Brazilian people